This is a list of nations by when they recognized the United States.

List

See also 

 Diplomatic relations of the United States

Notes

References

Nations by date of recognition
Diplomatic recognition